George Piștereanu (born 13 November 1990) is a Romanian actor. He lives in Los Angeles, California. His major role was Silviu in "If I Want to Whistle, I Whistle" – a Florin Șerban drama which received the Silver Bear and Alfred Bauer awards at the 2010 Berlin Film Festival. This drama got George his first Best Actor Award at the Stockholm Film Festival and a nomination for the European Best Actor at the European Film Awards in 2011.

After graduation from the Caragiale National University of Theatre and Film in 2012, George was a playwright actor on prestigious National Theatre Bucharest stage in drama and comedy plays – Mozart in the Amadeus play (2015) as well as other plays in the company of some of Romania's best known actors: Sebastian Papaiani, Ion Dichiseanu, Victoria Cocias.

His career continued to ascend through notable movie roles: Luca main role in "Loverboy" (2011), Tibor in "You're Ugly Too" drama nominated for the Generation K-Plus at the Berlinale Film Festival 2014, Alex in "The Whistler" (2018) drama nominated for the Cannes Official Selection 2019, Vali in "The Asset" (2021) and Carlos in "The Contractor" (2022).

Piștereanu's acting career extends in many Romanian Television series, playing Tibor in "Vlad", one of the most popular television dramas.

Selected filmography

References

External links 

https://www.georgepistereanu.com/

1990 births
Living people
Male actors from Bucharest
Romanian male film actors
Caragiale National University of Theatre and Film alumni
Romanian male television actors